The Ibero-American Championships in Athletics (Spanish: Campeonato Iberoamericano de Atletismo) is a biennial athletics competition for athletes representing Ibero-American countries as well as a number of other Spanish- or Portuguese-speaking countries in Africa. The competition is organised by the Asociación Iberoamericana de Atletismo (Ibero-American Athletics Association).

The idea of such a competition first came about in 1982 when the Asociación Iberoamericana de Atletismo (AIA) was officially formed in Madrid with 22 countries as signatories. Following official sanctioning by the International Association of Athletics Federations (IAAF), the AIA established the Ibero-American Championships which first took place in Barcelona, Spain in 1983.

Ibero-American Games
The Ibero American Games (Spanish: Juegos Iberoamericanos) was a precursor to the regional championships and was held twice, first in 1960 and finally in 1962.

Editions

Medal table (1983–2014)

Championship records
Key:

Men

Women

Ibero-American Marathon/Half Marathon Championships
Sometimes, Ibero-American Marathon or Half Marathon Championships were held separately from the regular championships.

See also
 Ibero-American Championships in Weightlifting
 Ibero-American Go Federation, for Ibero-America
 Central American and Caribbean Championships
 Athletics at the Lusophony Games
 South American Championships in Athletics
 Iberian 10,000 Metres Championships

References

Records
El Atletismo Ibero-Americano – San Fernando 2010 (pgs. 219–220). RFEA. Retrieved on 2012-01-09.

External links
Championship records
Enciclopedia cubana

 
International athletics competitions
Athletics competitions in South America
Athletics competitions in Central America
Athletics competitions in Europe
Iberian Peninsula
Recurring sporting events established in 1960
Biennial athletics competitions